Perna may refer to:

 Perna (surname)
 Perna, Bosanska Krupa, a village in Bosnia and Herzegovina
 Perna, Croatia, a village near Vrginmost, Croatia
 Perna, Poland, a village in Kutno County, Poland
 Perná a village in Břeclav District, Czech Republic
 Pernå, a municipality in Finland
 Perna caste, a Hindu caste in India
 Perna-de-pau, a population of native Portuguese-speakers, recognized as Indians in 1993
 Perna Krick (1909–1991), American sculptor, painter and teacher
 Perna (bivalve), a genus of saltwater mussel
 Perna perna, an economically important mussel, a bivalve mollusc belonging to the family Mytilidae
 Perna canaliculus, the New Zealand green-lipped mussel
 Perna viridis, the Asian green mussel